The sixteenth season of the American reality television show The Voice premiered on February 25, 2019, on NBC. Adam Levine, Kelly Clarkson, and Blake Shelton returning as coaches from the previous season. John Legend was a new addition as a coach this season, replacing Jennifer Hudson. this is the eleventh season to feature three male coaches on the panel since season ten.  For the second time, the show featured a fifth coach, Bebe Rexha, who selected contestants to participate in The Comeback Stage, replacing Kelsea Ballerini as the fifth coach.

This is the first season trios are allowed in the show, and also the first (and only) season to feature a "Live Cross Battles", similar to the Chinese counterpart of The Voice (The Voice of China and Sing! China) whereas artists compete against artists from opposing teams for a place in the Live Shows. "The Comeback Stage" twist also returned and it now extended until the "Live Cross Battles". The Live Shows now followed eliminations similar to the semifinals since season nine with the artists receiving a higher vote count directly advances or lower vote count eliminated immediately.

Maelyn Jarmon was named winner of this season, marking Legend's first win as a coach and making him the second new coach (after Clarkson) to have a winning artist on his first attempt.

Coaches and hosts

On September 13, 2018, John Legend was confirmed as new coach, replacing Jennifer Hudson, who opted out from the coaching panel to serve as coach of The Voice UK. Legend joined Adam Levine, Blake Shelton and Kelly Clarkson. Carson Daly returned for his sixteenth season as host. This is John Legend's second appearance after he appeared as Team Adam's battle advisor on the twelfth season. This is also Legend and Kelly Clarkson's second competition show before the show appearing Duets.
This season's advisors for the Battle Rounds are Charlie Puth (who previously appeared in the eleventh season in the series as an advisor) for Team Adam,  Kelsea Ballerini (who was the coach for last season's "Comeback Stage") for Team Kelly, Khalid for Team Legend, and Brooks & Dunn for Team Blake.

Teams

Blind auditions
Color key

Episode 1 (February 25)

Episode 2 (February 26)

Episode 3 (March 4)
This episode is dedicated in memory of season 13 contestant Janice Freeman who died of a blood clot in her lung two days before this episode aired.

Episode 4 (March 5)

Episode 5 (March 11)

Episode 6 (March 18)

Episode 7 (March 20)
This episode, titled "The Best of The Blind Auditions," featured certain Blind Auditions from the season before the battles began.

The Battles 
The Battle Rounds started on March 25. Season sixteen's advisors include: Charlie Puth for Team Adam, Khalid for Team John, Kelsea Ballerini for Team Kelly, and Brooks & Dunn for Team Blake. The coaches could steal two losing artists from other coaches. Contestants who won their battle or were stolen by another coach advanced to the new Live Cross Battles, which replaced the Knockout Rounds. Three eliminated artists were chosen by Bebe Rexha and have the opportunity to compete in "The Comeback Stage".

Color key:

The Comeback Stage
This season's fifth coach, Bebe Rexha, mentored selected artists who did not make a team during the Blind Auditions as well as eliminated artists from later rounds of the competition, thus creating new rounds to The Comeback Stage. During the first round of competition, the six selected artists went head to head, two artists per episode, and Rexha selected a winner to move on to the next round. In the second round, Rexha brought back three artists who were eliminated during the Battle Rounds, giving them a chance to re-enter in the competition. These artists faced off against the three artists from the first round. The three winners performed in the Semifinals and one artist was eliminated. In the Finale, Rexha picked one artist to move forward and compete against another eliminated artist from the Live Cross Battles. The two remaining artists performed in the Top 24 Live Results Show for America's votes in the Twitter Instant Save, with the winner officially joining one of the four main teams of their choosing as a part of the Top 13.

The Battles

First Round (from blind audition)

Second round

The Semifinals

The Finals

Live Playoffs

Live shows

Weeks 1 & 2: Live Cross Battles (April 15, 16, 22, & 23)
The new Live Cross Battles round began with 32 artists remaining in the competition. Over the course of two weeks, eight pairs of artists performed each Monday. Coaches selected an artist from their team, then challenged a fellow coach to compete against, and this coach selected an artist as well. On the Tuesday results shows, the winner of each Cross Battle was revealed, for a total of 16 artists advancing to the next round based on America's votes. Each coach also had one save and one steal to use over the course of the Cross Battles. Coaches were only given ten seconds to press their button. 24 artists in total advanced to the next round of competition. The table for the Cross Battles are reflected by the order of the results announcement and not by the order of performance.

Note: The table below is ordered by the results' announcement, as the performances' order was not the same.

Color key:

Week 3: Playoffs (April 29 & 30)
The new Live Top 24 round took place on April 29, with results following on April 30. Eight artists from any four teams were saved by the public and advance to the Top 13. Each coach chose one of their own artists to advance.

This season, same as last season, the artist who racked up the most streams on Apple Music during the voting window had their Apple Music votes multiplied by 5. The recipient of the Apple Music multiplier was Gyth Rigdon. Kanard Thomas, the winner of the Comeback Stage Finals, competed against LB Crew who was eliminated in the Live Cross Battles. America chose LB through an Instant Save, and he completed the Top 13 by rejoining Team Adam.

Color key:

Week 4: Top 13 (May 6 & 7)
The theme for this week was "Fan Night", meaning that the artists performed songs chosen by the fans.

Eliminations were similar to the semifinal rounds since season nine. The seven artists with the most votes directly advance to the Top eight, while the three artists with the fewest votes were instantly eliminated, and the middle three fought for the remaining spot in the Top 8 via Instant Save.

The recipient of the Apple Music multiplier this week was Maelyn Jarmon in addition to have her single reached #9 of the top 10 chart on iTunes.

With the elimination of Jej Vinson, this was the very first time that Kelly Clarkson would only have one artist (Rod Stokes) going into the semifinals. With the eliminations of Mari and LB Crew, Levine no longer had any artists remaining on his team, making it the third consecutive season (and fifth overall) in which none of his finalists represented in the finale; however, this was the second season in which he had lost his entire team before the semifinals since season three, the first season which this situation occurred.

Color key:

Week 5: Semifinals (May 13 & 14)
The Top 8 performed on Monday, May 13, 2019, with the results following on Tuesday, May 14, 2019. The three artists with the most votes directly advances on to the finale. The two artists with the fewest votes were immediately eliminated and the middle three contended for the remaining spot in the Finale via the Instant Save. In addition to their individual songs, each artist performed a The Beatles duet with another artist in the competition, though these duets were not available for purchase on iTunes.

With the elimination of Stokes, Clarkson no longer had any artists remaining on her team, thus breaking her two-season winning streak, and also marked the first season since her debut as a coach none of her artists would represent in the finale, and thus also became the first season after season seven in which only two coaches would be represented in the finale. Shelton would also become the second coach to represent three artists to the finale, the first one being Levine in the seventh season. This was also the first time since the eighth season in which no female coach would be represented in the finale.

In addition, with the advancement of Jarmon to the finale, Legend became the fourth new coach to successfully coach an artist on his team to the finale on his first attempt as a coach, the third being Clarkson, who coached Brynn Cartelli all the way to the finale of the fourteenth season, the second being Alicia Keys, who coached Wé McDonald all the way to the finale of the eleventh season, and the first being Usher, who coached Michelle Chamuel all the way to the finale of the fourth season.

The singles charted in Top 10 for iTunes charts this week were Jarmon (#3) and Rigdon (#9), for the former becoming the Apple Music multiplier recipient  for the second straight week.

Week 6: Finale (May 20 & 21)
The final 4 performed on Monday, May 20, 2019, with the final results following on Tuesday, May 21, 2019. This week, the four finalists performed a solo cover song, a duet with their coach, and an original song.

The contestant's performances reached the top 10 on iTunes as follows Jarmon (#1, #4 & #8), Rigdon (#5) and Andrew Sevener (#10).

Elimination chart

Color key 
Artists' info

  Team Adam
  Team Legend
  Team Kelly
  Team Blake
  Comeback Stage Artist

Results' details

  Winner
  Runner-up
  Third place
  Fourth place
  Saved by Instant Save (via Twitter)
  Saved by the public
  Saved by his/her coach
  Stolen by another coach
  Artist won the Comeback Stage (via Twitter) and joined another team
  Selected to participate in the Comeback Stage
  Eliminated

Overall

Per team

Ratings

References

External links

Season 16
2019 American television seasons